Melati Untuk Marvel (English translations: Melati For Marvel) is an Indonesian TV serial that aired on SCTV. The show ran for over 300 daily episodes without a break, and had good ratings throughout.

Synopsis
The show tells the story of the interpersonal relationships between Melati (Chelsea Olivia Wijaya), Marvel (Rezky Aditya), (Devi Permatasari), and Aditya (Chris Laurent).

Cast
 Chelsea Olivia Wijaya as Melati/Jasmine
 Rezky Aditya as Marvel/Jay
 Fendy Chow as Dika
 Christ Laurent as Aditya
 Neshia Putri as Shafa
 Afifa Syahira as Aurel
 Gracia Indri as Kezia
 Devi Permatasari as Mrs. Anggi
 Mpok Ati as Mrs. Lily
 Emma Waroka Hawkins as Mrs. Selva
 Marcello Djorghi as Mr. Slamet
 Krisna Murti Wibowo as Mr. Surya
 Ryan Delon as Fariz
 Donny Michael as Reyhan
 Ochi Anggraini as Mrs. Fatimah
 Fikri Ramadhan as Tukul
 Yoelitta Palar as Mrs. Dewi
 Kiky Azhari as Julia
 Ridwan Ghani as Dhimas
 Gaxel Anyndra as Little Melati
 Raphael Purnama as Marvin
 Ayudhia Bing Slamet as Syarifah
 Adhi Pawitra as Bagus
 Cut Keke as Salma

Awards and nominations

References

External links
http://www.mdentertainment.net

Indonesian television series